Fanconi anemia, complementation group I (FANCI) also known as KIAA1794, is a protein which in humans is encoded by the FANCI gene. Mutations in the FANCI gene are known to cause Fanconi anemia.

Function 

The Fanconi anemia complementation group (FANC) currently includes FANCA, FANCB, FANCC, FANCD1 (also called BRCA2), FANCD2, FANCE, FANCF, FANCG, FANCI, FANCJ (also called BRIP1), FANCL, FANCM and FANCN (also called PALB2). The previously defined group FANCH is the same as FANCA. Fanconi anemia is a genetically heterogeneous recessive disorder characterized by cytogenetic instability, hypersensitivity to DNA crosslinking agents, increased chromosomal breakage, and defective DNA repair. The members of the Fanconi anemia complementation group do not share sequence similarity; they are related by their assembly into a common nuclear protein complex. This gene encodes the protein for complementation group I. Alternative splicing results in two transcript variants encoding different isoforms.

FANCI forms a heterodimer with FANCD2 protein. Both FANCD2 and FANCI are monoubiquitinated by the Fanconi anemia core complex subunit FANCL. FANCI monoubiquitination is essential for repairing DNA interstrand crosslinks, and clamps the protein on DNA together with its partner protein FANCD2. The monoubiquitinated FANCD2:FANCI complex coats DNA in a filament-like array, potentially as a way to protect DNA associated with stalled replication.

In addition to proteins involved in DNA repair, FANCI interacts with proteins localized to the nucleolus, the nuclear body where ribosome biogenesis initiates.  FANCI functions in the processing of the pre-ribosomal RNA (pre-rRNA) for the large ribosomal subunit, the transcription of pre-rRNA by RNAPI, maintaining levels of the mature 28S ribosomal RNA (rRNA), and the global cellular translation of proteins by ribosomes. In the nucleolus, FANCI is predominantly in the deubiquitinated form and interacts with the large subunit of RNAPI and members of the PeBoW complex (PES1 and BOP1).  There may be another role for FA proteins outside the nucleolus in ribosome biogenesis or protein translation as FANCI and FANCD2 are the only FA proteins associated with polysomes.

Meiosis

In mice, FANCI protein participates in meiotic recombination of germ cells, and deletion of the Fanci gene causes a strong meiotic phenotype and severe hypogonadism.  Fanci-/- male mice have completely impaired spermatogenesis, and female Fanci-/- mice produce no ovarian follicles.

References

Further reading

External links

Human proteins